Zaratite is a bright emerald green nickel carbonate mineral with formula Ni3CO3(OH)4·4H2O. Zaratite crystallizes in the isometric crystal system as massive to mammillary encrustations and vein fillings. It has a specific gravity of 2.6 and a Mohs hardness of 3 to 3.5. It has no cleavage and is brittle to conchoidal fracture. The luster is vitreous to greasy.

It is a rare secondary mineral formed by hydration or alteration of the primary nickel and iron bearing minerals, chromite, pentlandite, pyrrhotite, and millerite, during the serpentinization of ultramafic rocks. Hellyerite, NiCO3·6H2O, is a related mineral.

It was found originally in Galicia, Spain in 1851, and named after Spanish diplomat and dramatist Antonio Gil y Zárate (1793–1861).

See also
 Nickel(II) carbonate

References

Carbonate minerals
Cubic minerals
Nickel minerals